Project: Twilight is a Big Finish Productions audio drama based on the long-running British science fiction television series Doctor Who. Sequels to this story include Project: Valhalla (a novel featuring characters from Twilight), Project: Longinus (a web-comic published by Scott and Wright), the audio dramas Project: Lazarus and Project: Destiny, and the short story 'Project: Wildthyme'.

Plot
1999. The Sixth Doctor and Evelyn try to find out what connects "Project: Twilight", a secret government initiative, to a seedy casino in London Docklands.

Cast
The Doctor – Colin Baker
Evelyn Smythe – Maggie Stables
Dr William Abberton – Rupert Booth
Nurse – Kate Hadley
Amelia Doory – Holly de Jong
Reggie Mead – Rob Dixon
Cassie – Rosie Cavaliero
Mr Deeks – Mark Wright
Eddie – Daniel Wilson
Nimrod – Stephen Chance
Matthew – Rupert Booth

See also

External links
Big Finish Productions – Project: Twilight

Sixth Doctor audio plays
2001 audio plays
Vampires in popular culture
Fiction set in 1999